Danyon Joseph Loader  (born 21 April 1975) is an Olympic champion, former world record holder swimmer from New Zealand, based in Dunedin. He remains the national record holder in the 400 metre freestyle short course.

He swam for New Zealand at two Summer Olympics (1992, 1996) and three Commonwealth Games (1990, 1994 and 1998).

At the 1992 Olympics in Barcelona, he garnered a silver medal in the 200 metre butterfly. In 1996 in Atlanta, Loader won two gold medals: in the 200 and 400 metre freestyle. He set world records in the short course 200 butterfly and 400 freestyle. In the 1997 New Year Honours, Loader was appointed an Officer of the New Zealand Order of Merit, for services to swimming, and he was inducted into the International Swimming Hall of Fame in 2003.

In December 2012, Loader starred in an online video campaign supporting same-sex marriage, alongside New Zealand singers Anika Moa, Hollie Smith, and Boh Runga, as well as past Governor-General Dame Catherine Tizard.

See also
 List of members of the International Swimming Hall of Fame
 List of Commonwealth Games medallists in swimming (men)
 List of Olympic medalists in swimming (men)
 World record progression 200 metres butterfly
 World record progression 400 metres freestyle

References

External links
 
 
 
 
 
 
 

|-

|-

|-

|-

|-

|-

|-

1975 births
New Zealand male butterfly swimmers
Commonwealth Games bronze medallists for New Zealand
Commonwealth Games gold medallists for New Zealand
Commonwealth Games silver medallists for New Zealand
Swimmers at the 1994 Commonwealth Games
Swimmers at the 1998 Commonwealth Games
World record setters in swimming
New Zealand male freestyle swimmers
New Zealand LGBT rights activists
Living people
Officers of the New Zealand Order of Merit
Olympic gold medalists for New Zealand
Olympic silver medalists for New Zealand
Olympic swimmers of New Zealand
Sportspeople from Timaru
Swimmers at the 1992 Summer Olympics
Swimmers at the 1996 Summer Olympics
World Aquatics Championships medalists in swimming
Medalists at the 1996 Summer Olympics
Medalists at the 1992 Summer Olympics
Olympic silver medalists in swimming
Olympic gold medalists in swimming
Commonwealth Games medallists in swimming
Swimmers from Dunedin
20th-century New Zealand people
Medallists at the 1994 Commonwealth Games
Medallists at the 1998 Commonwealth Games